Phyllonorycter purgantella is a moth of the family Gracillariidae. It is known from southern France and Spain.

The larvae feed on Cytisus purgans. They mine the leaves of their host plant. They create a lower surface tentiform mine.

References

purgantella
Moths of Europe
Moths described in 1915